Four Flies on Grey Velvet is a 1971 giallo film written and directed by Dario Argento. The film concerns Roberto Tobias (Michael Brandon), who accidentally kills a man and is then tormented by someone who witnessed the event. The film was an Italian and French production between the Rome-based company Seda Spettacoli and the Paris-based Universal Productions France.

Plot 
Roberto Tobias, a band drummer, is being followed by a suspicious figure. He chases and confronts the stalker, who pulls a knife; in the following struggle, Roberto accidentally stabs and apparently kills the man. A masked figure snaps several photographs as this happens. In the ensuing days, Roberto receives threatening letters about his killing the stalker, Carlo Marosi.

At home that night, Roberto is ambushed by the masked individual, who tells him they are not finished with him before knocking him out. The maid, Amelia, witnesses this from the shadows. When Roberto's wife Nina returns home, he confesses everything to her but refuses to go to the police since he will be arrested for Marosi's murder. Amelia, who now knows the masked figure's identity, tries to blackmail them but is killed by them in a park. Despite Roberto's reluctance, Nina's cousin Dalia arrives to stay with Nina and Roberto.

Elsewhere, Carlo Marosi is still alive: his confrontation with Roberto was staged with a retractable knife. Marosi is working for Roberto's tormentor. Unnerved by Amelia's murder, Marosi tries to back out of their arrangement, but instead, the mystery figure kills him.

Roberto hires Arrosio, a flamboyant detective, to identify his tormentor. When Roberto returns home, he finds Nina leaving. She tells him she will no longer stay in the house with someone stalking them. Roberto resolves to remain. That evening, Dalia offers to take care of Roberto in the meantime, and the two start having sexual trysts after Roberto makes passes at her while in the tub.

After researching Roberto and Nina's history, Arrosio visits Villa Rapidi, a psychiatric facility. He speaks with a doctor about an unnamed patient diagnosed as a homicidal maniac. When this patient's father suddenly died, the psychotic symptoms inexplicably disappeared, and the patient was discharged. Later, while trailing the unidentified patient, Arrosio is ambushed and murdered with a poison-filled syringe.

Meanwhile, looking at family photos, Dalia notices a strange similarity between a photograph of Roberto and another one whose subject the audience can't see. The killer suddenly appears and stabs her to death. The police use optography to generate an image of the last thing Dalia saw before death but only get a blurry picture of four dark smudges against a gray background. The technician says the image looks like "four flies on gray velvet."

Knowing the killer will likely come for him next, Roberto waits with a gun in his darkened home. Roberto's friend Godfrey calls, but the line suddenly goes dead. Just then, Nina arrives home. Roberto urges her to leave for her safety, but he notices Nina's pendant necklace. It is a fly enclosed in glass, and as it swings, it gives the appearance of several flies on a grey background.

As Roberto realizes Nina is the killer, Nina grabs Roberto's gun and shoots him in the shoulder. Holding Roberto at gunpoint, Nina explains that her physically and mentally abusive stepfather committed her to the Villa Rapidi asylum. His death cured her condition but left her frustrated because she had wanted to kill him. Because Roberto bears a striking resemblance to her stepfather, Nina decided to torment and murder Roberto as a surrogate for him. She married him and planned the elaborate, cruel game she had played with him. Nina repeatedly shoots Roberto, but Godfrey arrives, distracting Nina so that Roberto can knock the gun from her hands. Nina speeds away in a car, but she crashes into the back of a truck. The truck's rear bumper decapitates her, and the car explodes in a mass of flames.

Cast 
 Michael Brandon - Roberto Tobias
 Mimsy Farmer - Nina Tobias
 Jean-Pierre Marielle - Gianni Arrosio 
 Bud Spencer - Diomede/Godfrey
 Aldo Bufi Landi - Pathologist
 Calisto Calisti - Carlo Marosi
 Marisa Fabbri - Amelia, the Maid
 Oreste Lionello - The Professor
 Fabrizio Moroni - Mirko
 Corrado Olmi - Porter
 Stefano Satta Flores - Andrea
 Laura Troschel - Maria 
 Francine Racette - Dalia

Production 
Some of the earlier cast considerations for the main role Roberto Tobias were Terence Stamp, Michael York and even some members of the Beatles. Argento did not want to use the "image caught in the retina" plot device since it was too fantastic.

Release 
Four Flies on Grey Velvet premiered in Italy on 17 December 1971. From 23 December 1971 to 30 January 1972, the film grossed $1.2 million from 46 theatres in Italy.

Critical reception 
From contemporary reviews, Howard Thompson, in his review for The New York Times, praised the film for its "striking, imaginative color photography and deep-freeze pacing and atmosphere" and highlighted the sequence where Amelia is trapped in the park as "spine-tingling", "superb" and "Argento at his chilling best". However, he criticized the plot as "not only old but farfetched" and the dialogue as "banal", and went on to say that "[a]ll that circuitous teasing and those red herrings don't produce a shred of real evidence to nibble on. You're on your own, in pure hit-or-miss speculation." Roger Ebert gave the film a  mixed review of two-and-a-half stars out of four, deeming it a "badly dubbed and incoherent murder thriller" with "a conclusion that's so arbitrary we feel tricked." He did, however, give praise to Mimsy Farmer and said of her that she "deserves to get some of those Mia Farrow roles." Gene Siskel of the Chicago Tribune gave the film one star out of four and wrote, "Argento's script contains more red herrings than the Cape Cod Room. Each time evidence overwhelmingly points to a possible threat to our bushy-haired hero that person is bumped off and the guessing game begins anew. I didn't find that rhythm the least bit entertaining." Variety faulted "a script bogged down with farce comedy, unneeded sex, coarse language and trite dialogue." Kevin Thomas of the Los Angeles Times wrote that the film generally "works when nobody's talking and the camera's moving." He thought that several "badly dubbed, broadly burlesqued characters are totally ludicrous and destroy utterly the film's credibility." David Pirie of the Monthly Film Bulletin noted it being "full of slick visual conceits and glossy set-pieces, this is clearly Argento's most expensive and ambitious thriller yet." while stating its still as "flat and predictable as that of the most meager Italian 'B' feature."

Leonard Maltin's Movie Guide gave the film two stars out of four and opined it was an "[u]nabsorbing psychological murder-mystery with performers who walk through their roles in a very disinterested fashion."

Writer Fran Lebowitz, who had a column reviewing bad-movies, told Glenn O'Brien in a 1978 issue of High Times, that, "the worst movie I ever saw was called Four Flies on Gray Velvet, with Mimsy Farmer, one of your great loves. But to this day I have never seen a worse movie."

AllMovie gave the film a positive review, calling it "an unfortunately overlooked and hard-to-find choice nugget in his [Argento's] oeuvre".

Home video 
It was not until early 2009 that the film was made available to home video audiences in a legitimate version, both domestically or internationally, with the exception of the long out-of-print obscure French VHS. The rights to this film (at least in America) are owned by Paramount Pictures, which had chosen not to release it.

MYA Communication released a region 1 DVD of Four Flies on Grey Velvet on 24 February 2009. The disc contains an uncut, completely remastered print of this "lost" film, featuring theatrical trailers, the English language opening and ending credits and an extensive photo gallery. However, this release omits 30–40 seconds of footage due to print damage.

To celebrate the film's 40th anniversary and to mark 20 years since it was thought to be lost, Shameless Screen Entertainment released it on Blu-ray and DVD in the UK on 30 January 2012.

See also 
 List of Italian films of 1971

References

Sources

External links 

 

1970s crime films
1970s mystery films
1970s psychological thriller films
Italian thriller films
French thriller films
1970s Italian-language films
Giallo films
Films directed by Dario Argento
Italian serial killer films
Films scored by Ennio Morricone
Films with screenplays by Dario Argento
1970s Italian films
1970s French films